Imtihan (translation: Examination) is a 1994 Indian Hindi-language action romance film directed by Harry Baweja, starring Sunny Deol, Saif Ali Khan and Raveena Tandon.

Plot 
Vicky (Saif Ali Khan) is a popular singer, who meets and falls in love with Preeti (Raveena Tandon). He asks permission to marry her from her father, who instantly approves of him. Preeti is reluctant to get married but agrees for her father's sake. Soon, her father falls ill, and he makes her promise that she will not tell Vicky about her past life.

A few years earlier, Preeti had fallen in love with and married Raja (Sunny Deol) against her father's wishes. Though the two were very happy together, they were cruelly separated when Raja got involved in an accident and disappeared. Preeti returned to her father's house, where she learnt that she was pregnant. She gave birth to a daughter; however, her father sent the baby to an orphanage.

After marrying Vicky, Preeti is quite happy with him. She meets her daughter, Pinky, in the orphanage, and decides to legally adopt her. Vicky, who does not know about Preeti's connection to Pinky, opposes the adoption because he looks forward to having his own children some day. Preeti continues to meet Pinky. However, a mysterious stranger also contacts Preeti. She starts to receive phone calls from someone, and repeatedly lies to Vicky regarding her whereabouts. Convinced that Preeti is having an extramarital affair, Vicky follows her. It turns out she is being called by Raja, her first husband, who is alive and wants to adopt Pinky. Vicky goes out of his mind when he finds about this, but agrees to adopt Pinky when he learns the whole truth. This is followed by some action scenes, which result in Raja's death.

Cast 
 Sunny Deol as Raja
 Saif Ali Khan as Vicky
 Raveena Tandon as Preeti
 Shakti Kapoor as Shekhar
 Dalip Tahil as Dindayal Khanna
 Gulshan Grover as Gulshan
 Mohan Joshi as K.K. 
 Asrani as Nandu
 Avtar Gill as Dr. Pandey
 Shammi as Orphanage Manager
 Baby Ghazala as Pinky
 Anil Nagrath as Ishwarchand
 Brij Gopal as Police Inspector

Soundtrack

External links

References

1994 films
1990s Hindi-language films
Films scored by Anu Malik
Films directed by Harry Baweja
Indian romantic action films